Mitchellville is an upper-class majority African-American unincorporated area and census-designated place (CDP) in Prince George's County, Maryland, United States. Per the 2020 census, the population was 11,136.

Geography

Demographics

2020 census

Note: the US Census treats Hispanic/Latino as an ethnic category. This table excludes Latinos from the racial categories and assigns them to a separate category. Hispanics/Latinos can be of any race.

2000 Census
As of the United States Census of 2000, there were 9,611 people, 3,148 households, and 2,556 families residing in the CDP. The racial makeup of the CDP was 13.29% White, 78.50% Black, 0.26% Native American, 3.93% Asian, 0.06% Pacific Islander, 0.80% from other races, and 3.15% from two or more races. 2.09% of the population were Hispanic or Latino of any race.

There were 3,148 households, out of which 41.1% had children under the age of 18 living with them, 61.8% were married couples living together, 15.3% had a female householder with no husband present, and 18.8% were non-families. 15.2% of all households were made up of individuals, and 1.8% had someone living alone who was 65 years of age or older. The average household size was 3.02 and the average family size was 3.34.

In the CDP, the population was spread out, with 27.5% under the age of 18, 7.7% from 18 to 24, 28.5% from 25 to 44, 30.1% from 45 to 64, and 6.3% who were 65 years of age or older. The median age was 38 years. For every 100 females, there were 86.9 males. For every 100 females age 18 and over, there were 82.8 males.

The median income for a household in the CDP was $84,687, and the median income for a family was $118,022, ranking # 4 among the richest black communities in US as end of 2020. Males had a median income of $58,576 versus $66,875 for females. The per capita income for the CDP was $30,801. About 1.9% of families and 2.8% of the population were below the poverty line, including 3.7% of those under age 18 and 7.3% of those age 65 or over.

History
Mitchellville was named for John Mitchell (1788–1862), who owned Essington Hall, the plantation that encompassed much of the area. He and his wife Mary Lanham are buried in the Mitchell Family Cemetery on Mitchellville and Mount Oak Road. This location is now South Bowie, and the Bowie CDP 08775 
 An 1878 G.M. Hopkins Atlas shows "Mitchellville P.O." near the same corner of what is today Mitchellville and Mount Oak Road. In its original cataloging the name and place "Mitchellville", the USGS used the railroad guide "Mitchellville (Mulliki'n) G. S. Owensville sheet Mitchellville P. G. 614 Mulliken R.'R. Guide, 314." as a basis in its decision card documentation where a Mullikin/Mitchellville railroad stop served also as the post office.  This is also seen in other historic maps

As of 2010, the Census designated place ("CDP") Mitchellville is no longer encompassing of the original Mitchellville, location of the old Essington Hall, but is drawn one CDP tract over on the west of the Woodmore CDP.

Also, see "Woodmore" for common historical information

Government and infrastructure
Prince George's County Police Department District 2 Station in Brock Hall CDP, with a Bowie postal address, serves the community.

Education
Prince George's County Public Schools serve Mitchellville.

Kingsford, Ardmore, Woodmore, and Lake Arbor elementary schools serve sections of Mitchellville CDP. Most of Mitchellville CDP is served by Ernest Everett Just Middle School, while a portion is zoned to Thomas Johnson Middle School. Most of Mitchellville CDP is served by Charles Herbert Flowers High School, while a portion is zoned to DuVal High School.

References

African-American upper class
Census-designated places in Prince George's County, Maryland
Census-designated places in Maryland
Washington metropolitan area